The  1950 Campeonato Argentino de Rugby  was won by the selection of Buenos Aires Province ("Provincia") that beat the selection of Capital in the final.

This edition saw the first presence of the selections of La Plata and Río Paranà, formed by team of Santa Fe Province (Rosario excluded) and Entre Ríos. Before this club were part of the Unión de Rugby del Litoral Argentino. Starting from this time, it will be formed only by the club from Rosario.

Rugby Union in Argentina in 1950

 The "Championship of Buenos Aires" was shared by Club Universitario de Buenos Aires and Pucará
 The "Cordoba Province Championship" was won by Jockey Club Córdoba
 The North-East Championship was not assigned

Table

Knockout stages

Final 

Provincia: R. Frigerio (Pucará), C. Arana (CASI), A. Jones (Old G's), A. Palma (Pucará), E. Caffarone (Olivos), R. Giles (Pucará), G. Ehrman (Pucará), L. Allen (CASI), M. Sarandón (cap.) (SIC), D. Haxell (Old G's), E. Domínguez (Pucará), J. Neira (Curupaytí), N. Tompkins (Old G's), C. Swain (Old G's), R. Follet (Old G's).
 Capital: J. Genoud (C.U.B.A.), U. O'Farrel (C.U.B.A.), D. Wesley Smith (Bs. As.), J. Comotto (Hindú), D. Farrell (Hindú), R. Quian (C.U.B.A.), P. Felisari (Belgrano), A. Dillon (Belgrano), E. Holmberg (C.U.B.A.), J. O'Farrell (C.U.B.A.), A. Phillips(cap.) (Belgrano), C. Morea (C.U.B.A.), A. Bori (Belgrano), H. Achaval (C.U.B.A.), R. Pont Lezica (C.U.B.A.).

Bibliography 
  Memorias de la UAR 1950
  VI Campeonato Argentino

Campeonato Argentino de Rugby
Argentina
Campeonato